Diamond Princess is a British-registered  cruise ship owned and operated by Princess Cruises. She began operation in March 2004 and primarily cruises in Asia during the northern hemisphere summer and Australia during the southern hemisphere summer. She is a subclassed  ship, which is also known as a Gem-class ship. Diamond Princess and Sapphire Princess were both built in Nagasaki, Japan, by Mitsubishi Industries.

There have been two notable outbreaks of infectious disease on the ship – an outbreak of gastroenteritis caused by norovirus in 2016 and an outbreak of COVID-19 caused by SARS-CoV-2 in 2020. In the latter incident, the ship was quarantined for nearly a month with her passengers on board, and her passengers and crew were subject to further quarantine after disembarking. At least 712 out of the 3,711 passengers and crew were infected, and by mid-April 2020 nine had died.

Design and description

The diesel-electric plant of Diamond Princess has four diesel generators and a gas turbine generator. The diesel generators are Wärtsilä 46 series common rail engines, two straight 9-cylinder configuration (9L46), and two straight 8-cylinder configuration (8L46). These engines are fueled with heavy fuel oil (HFO or bunker c) and marine gas oil (MGO) depending on the local regulations regarding emissions, as MGO produces much lower emissions, but is much more expensive.

The gas turbine generator is a General Electric LM2500, producing a peak of  fueled by MGO. This generator is much more expensive to run than the diesel generators, and is used mostly in areas, such as Alaska, where the emissions regulations are strict. It is also used when high speed is required to make it to a port in a shorter time period.

There are two propulsion electric motors, driving fixed-pitch propellers and six thrusters used during maneuvering – three at the bow and three at the stern. The propulsion electric motors (PEMs), are conventional synchronous motors made by Alstom Motors. The two motors are each rated to 20 MW and have a maximum speed of 154 rpm. (Rated speed of 0-145 rpm.)

In June 2017 Diamond Princess was retrofitted with a hull air lubrication system to reduce fuel consumption and related CO2 emissions.

Construction and career
Diamond Princess was built in Japan by Mitsubishi Heavy Industries, the first Princess Cruises ship to be built in a Japanese shipyard. She and her sister ship were the largest cruise ships to be built by Mitsubishi since the Crystal Harmony in 1991.

The ship was originally intended to be christened Sapphire Princess. However, construction of another ship – the one intended to be Diamond Princess (currently sailing as ) – was delayed when fire swept through her decks during construction. Because completion of the damaged ship would be delayed for some time, her sister ship, which was also under construction, was renamed Diamond Princess. The name swap helped keep the delivery of Diamond Princess on time. Due to the fire and name swap, both vessels would be the last Carnival Corporation & plc vessels built by Mitsubishi until the completion of AIDAprima in 2016.

Prior to 2014, Diamond Princess alternated sailing north and southbound voyages of the glacier cruises during the northern summer months and in the southern summer, she sailed from Australia and New Zealand. Starting in 2014, she undertook cruises from Yokohama for Tokyo or Kobe in the northern summer season.

For the 2016–17 season, she sailed round-trip cruises in the northern winter months from Singapore. Kota Kinabalu was added as part of her destination along with Vietnamese port of Nha Trang in December 2016. She resumed voyaging from Sydney for the 2017–18 season.

After the 2018 Australia and New Zealand cruises, Diamond Princess was re-positioned into South-East Asia for most of 2018, varying between Japan, South Korea, Singapore, Vietnam, Taiwan and Malaysia.

2016 gastroenteritis cases
In February 2016, Diamond Princess experienced a gastroenteritis outbreak, caused by norovirus sickening 158 passengers and crew on board, as confirmed after arrival in Sydney by NSW Health.

Coronavirus disease 2019

On 20 January 2020, an 80-year-old passenger from Hong Kong embarked in Yokohama, sailed one segment of the itinerary, and disembarked in Hong Kong on 25 January. He visited a local Hong Kong hospital, six days after leaving the ship, where he later tested positive for COVID-19 on 1 February. On its next voyage, 4 February, the ship was in Japanese waters when 10 passengers were diagnosed with COVID-19 during the early stages of the COVID-19 pandemic.

The ship was quarantined on 4 February in the Port of Yokohama in Japan. The infected included at least 138 from India (including 132 crew and 6 passengers), 35 Filipinos, 32 Canadians, 24 Australians, 13 Americans, 4 Indonesians, 4 Malaysians, and 2 Britons. Home countries arranged to evacuate their citizens and quarantine them further in their own countries. As of 1 March, all on board including the crew and the Italian captain Gennaro Arma had disembarked.

As of 16 March, at least 712 out of the 3,711 passengers and crew had tested positive for the virus. As of 14 April, fourteen of those who were on board had died from the disease. On 30 March, the ship was cleared to sail again after the ship was cleaned and disinfected.

On 16 May, Diamond Princess departed from the Port of Yokohama. Japan ended up paying 94% of the medical expenses incurred by the Diamond Princess passengers. All cruises throughout 2020 remained cancelled and as of March 2021 the ship was bunkering in Malaysia and the outer port limit (OPL) area of Singapore Port.

Quarantine!, a book written by passenger Gay Courter on her experience on board the quarantined vessel, was released in November 2020. The HBO documentary The Last Cruise tells the story of the voyage.

Post-pandemic return to service

After the lay-up induced by the COVID-19, Diamond Princess was announced as returning to service in August 2022. However, the first three months of scheduled cruises had to be cancelled due to staffing issues.

Diamond Princess officially returned to service in November 2022.

References

External links

 Diamond Princess – Princess Cruises

Ships of Princess Cruises
Ships built by Mitsubishi Heavy Industries
2003 ships
Cruise ships involved in the COVID-19 pandemic
COVID-19 pandemic in Japan